David Tyrrell may refer to:

 David Terrell (fighter) (born 1978), American mixed martial artist
 David Tyrrell (footballer) (born 1985), Irish footballer
 David Tyrrell (rugby league) (born 1988), Australian rugby league player
 David Terrell (safety) (born 1975), American football safety
 David Terrell (wide receiver) (born 1979), American football wide receiver
 David Tyrrell (physician) (1925–2005), British virologist
 D. Lorne Tyrrell (born 1935), Canadian physician